This is a compilation of the results of the teams representing the Czech Republic at official international women's football competitions, that is the UEFA Women's Cup and its successor, the UEFA Women's Champions League.

As of the 2016–17 edition the Czech Republic is ranked 10th in the UWCL's association standings, and it is thus one of twelve associations currently granted two spots in the competition. It has been represented by just two teams, Slavia and Sparta, which have dominated the Czech First Division to date. Both teams have made appearances in the quarterfinals.

Progression by season

1 Group stage. Highest-ranked eliminated team in case of qualification, lowest-ranked qualified team in case of elimination.

Results by team

Slavia Prague

Sparta Prague

References

Women's football clubs in international competitions
Women